The 2023 Big West Conference Women's basketball tournament is the postseason women's basketball tournament for the Big West Conference of the 2022–23 NCAA Division I women's basketball season. It is to be held March 7–11, 2023, at the Dollar Loan Center in Henderson, Nevada. The winner will receive the conference's automatic bid to the 2023 NCAA tournament. The women's championship will be broadcast exclusively on ESPN's over-the-top service, ESPN+.

Seeds
Of the 11 conference teams, 10 are eligible for the tournament. UC San Diego is ineligible for the tournament, as it is in the third year of the four-year transition required for teams transferring to Division I from Division II. Teams are seeded based on their performance within the conference, and teams with identical conference records are seeded using a tiebreaker system. Unlike previous years, reseeding teams after the quarterfinals will not take place for the 2023 tournament.

Schedule and results

Bracket

Note: * denotes overtime

References

Big West Conference women's basketball tournament
Tournament
Big West Conference men's basketball tournament
Big West Conference men's basketball tournament
Sports competitions in Henderson, Nevada
College basketball tournaments in Nevada
Women's sports in Nevada
Basketball competitions in the Las Vegas Valley
College sports tournaments in Nevada